The Bengal tiger and the Indian elephant are endangered species which are protected by Project Tiger and Project Elephant programmes run by Ministry of Environment and Forests, Government of India. Indian Leopards are vulnerable and protected species. The tiger numbers are of animals aged above 1.5 years.

India is home to 75% of the world's tiger population as well as 60% of Asian elephant population.

State-wise data
 The South Indian states of Karnataka, Kerala, Andhra Pradesh and Tamil Nadu are home to nearly 44% of the elephants, 35% of the tigers and 31% of the leopards in India.
The state of Karnataka alone is home to 22% of the elephants, 18% of the tigers and 14% of the leopards in India.
 The Northeast Indian states of Assam, Arunachal Pradesh, Mizoram, Meghalaya and Tripura  together with West Bengal account for 30% of the elephants and 5% of the tiger population.
The state of Gujarat is the only state with 100% of Asiatic lion population in the world.
 Information of the states Punjab, Haryana, Telangana, Manipur, Himachal Pradesh, Sikkim, Jammu and Kashmir are missing.

See also

 Wildlife of India

References

Wildlife population
States by wildlife population
States by wildlife population
States by wildlife population